Andrew "Andy" Graham (born 18 July 1963) is a former Australian rules footballer who played for the Carlton Football Club in the Victorian Football League (VFL).

Notes

External links 

Andrew Graham's profile at Blueseum

1963 births
Carlton Football Club players
Coburg Football Club players
Australian rules footballers from Victoria (Australia)
Living people